My Absolute Boyfriend is a South Korean television series created for SBS, based on the Japanese manga series of the same name. The romantic comedy drama series is produced by Apollo Pictures and iHQ, with Yeo Jin-goo, Bang Min-ah and Hong Jong-hyun as the main characters, and Jung Jung-hwa serving as director. It tells the story of a special effects makeup artist who has never had much success with love, and a humanoid robot built to become the ideal boyfriend.

During the course of the series, 36 episodes of My Absolute Boyfriend aired on SBS TV, while 40 episodes were released internationally. Depending on territory, the episodic guide below may differ.

Episodic guide

See also
My Absolute Boyfriend
Absolute Boyfriend (manga)

Notes

References

External links
 

Lists of South Korean drama television series episodes